Ensemble (literally "Together") is the second studio album by Kendji Girac. It was released on 30 October 2015 with "Me Quemo" released as the debut single from the album. The album has surpassed sales of a million of copies as of 2019 and was certified diamond in France and 2× platinum on Belgian francophone charts.

Other singles from the album include the promotional "Les yeux de la mama" in 2015 and "No me mires más" and "Tu y yo" in 2016. The album was also re-issued in November 2016, with "Sonrisa" and "Ma câlina" being released as two singles from the new issue of the album.

Track listing

2016 re-release bonus tracks

Charts

Weekly charts

Year-end charts

Certifications

References

2015 albums
Kendji Girac albums
Mercury Records albums
Universal Music France albums